The Osetr class were a group of submarines built for the Imperial Russian Navy during the Russo–Japanese War. The boats were ordered in the 1904 emergency programme. The boats were designed by American engineer Simon Lake and had wheels fitted for moving around on the sea bed as well as wet/dry chambers for divers. Osetr was the former Protector sold by Lake to the Russians and re-assembled in Russia.

Ships

All ships were built by the Lake company at the Libau Arsenal (Latvia) and were launched in 1904

References
 Conway's All the World's Fighting Ships 1906–1921

Submarine classes
Submarines of the Imperial Russian Navy